Stari Prisad is a unihabitated village and the old settlement of Prisad in Prilep, North Macedonia. Stari Prisad partly was one of the 4 villages which made up the name Prisad Island, an Antarctic island.

References

Villages in Prilep Municipality